The Feroz Award for Best Main Actor in a Film (Spanish: Premio Feroz al mejor actor protagonista) is one of the annual awards given at the Feroz Awards, presented by the Asociación de Informadores Cinematográficos de España. It was first awarded in 2014.

Winners and nominees

2010s

2020s

See also
 Goya Award for Best Actor
 Goya Award for Best New Actor

References

External links
 Official website

Awards established in 2014
2014 establishments in Spain
Feroz Awards
Film awards for lead actor